Stanley Frank Gilbertson (born October 29, 1944 in Duluth, Minnesota) is a retired American ice hockey player.  He played 428 games in the National Hockey League for the California Golden Seals, St. Louis Blues, Washington Capitals, and Pittsburgh Penguins between 1971 and 1977. He lost the lower part of his leg in a 1977 car accident right before training camp and had to retire from hockey. Gilbertson is the last player to score an NHL goal on Christmas Day, as the league has not scheduled a Christmas game since Gilbertson scored on December 25, 1971.

Career statistics

Regular season and playoffs

References

External links
 

1944 births
Living people
American men's ice hockey left wingers
California Golden Seals players
Clinton Comets players
Hershey Bears players
Ice hockey people from Duluth, Minnesota
Pittsburgh Penguins players
St. Louis Blues players
Vancouver Canucks (WHL) players
Washington Capitals players